Sarah Featherstone (born 1966 in Barnstaple, Devon) is a British architect.

Career 
Her practice, Featherstone Young, is based in London and has designed projects in the housing, community, cultural, education and commercial sectors. She is also a Co-Founder of VeloCity, a strategic growth and placemaking approach centered on a modernized vision of the English village.

Sarah studied architecture at Kingston University London, the Architectural Association School of Architecture and The Bartlett School of Architecture, UCL. Prior to setting up Featherstone Young with co-director Jeremy Young, she was a founding partner of Hudson Featherstone Architects, and Featherstone Waugh with Andrew Waugh (1992-1995).

Sarah teaches at Central St Martins, University of the Arts London (UAL), on the interdisciplinary MA Narrative Environment course, and has been a visiting critic at various UK architecture schools, including the Welsh School of Architecture - Cardiff University. 

She was an inaugural member of the CABE National Design Review Panel and has been an External Examiner at a number of universities including UCL, London Metropolitan University and Oxford Brookes University. 

She is a Civic Trust Awards judge and RIBA Awards judge and is currently on the Islington and St Albans Design Review panels, and formerly those of Southwark and Camden. Sarah and her work have been widely featured in various media, including Channel 4's Extraordinary Escapes with Sandi Toksvig, Channel 4's George Clarke's Amazing Spaces, Channel 4's Not all Houses are Square, BBC 2's The House That £100k Built, BBC 2's The Culture Show, BBC Radio 4's Woman's Hour, and BBC Radio 3's Night Waves.

Awards 
Established in 2002, Featherstone Young has won a number of awards, most recently RIBA Awards for Tŷ Pawb (2021), Stonecrop (2021) and Jack Windmill (2017); AJ Retrofit of the Year Award 2019 for Tŷ Pawb (2020); and the Gold Medal for Architecture of the National Eisteddfod of Wales for Tŷ Pawb (2019). RIBA Awards have also been awarded to homelessness charity Providence Row’s The Dellow Centre in London, SERICC (South Essex Rape and Incest Crisis Centre) and Ty Hedfan, a new house in Wales. 

The practice was a finalist in BD Architect of the Year Award (2017) and The Architecture Foundation’s Next Generation Award (2007)and BD Young Architect of the Year Award (2006).

Education
 1992-1994 Diploma, The Bartlett School of Architecture, UCL
 1991-1992 Diploma, the Architectural Association School of Architecture
 1986-1989] BA (Hons) Architecture,  Kingston University London

Significant Buildings
 Stonecrop, Rutland, England (2019)
 House, Haslemere, Surrey (2018)
 Bay 20 community centre and Dale Youth Amateur Boxing Club (previously housed in the Grenfell Tower), London (2018) 
 Tŷ Pawb (‘Everyone’s House’), Wrexham, Wales (2018)
 Jack Windmill, South Downs National Park (2017)
 Habitat House (2011–16)
 Waddington Studios: studios (Phase 1), house (Phase 2), London (2014–15)
 Byam Shaw School of Art campus redevelopment, London (2014)
 Staff Club at Central Saint Martin's Kings Cross Campus (2013)
 Dellow Arts and Activity Centre, Providence Row, East London (2012)
 Ty Hedfan, Pontfaen, Wales (2010)
 Sunshine Centre, Tilbury Thurrock (2007)
 SERICC (South Essex Rape and Incest Crisis Centre) (2007)
 Bayswater penthouse for Harry Handelsman (2007)
 Orchid House (2006)
 Room Set, Daily Telegraph House and Garden Fair (2004)
 Fordham White Hair Salon, Greek Street, London (2002)
 Drop House, Northaw, Herts (2001)
 Voss Street House (2002)
 Baggy House Pool (1998)
 Blue Note Club for Acid Jazz, previously the Bass Clef, Hoxton, London (1993)

Practices
 Featherstone Young
 Featherstone Associates
 Hudson Featherstone Architects
 Featherstone Waugh

Honours, decorations, awards and distinctions
 RIBA
 (2021) Tŷ Pawb
 (2021) Stonecrop
 (2017) Jack Windmill
 The Dellow Centre in London for Providence Row
 SERICC (South Essex Rape and Incest Crisis Centre)
 Ty Hedfan, a new house in Wales
 (2020) AJ Retrofit of the Year Award 2019 for Tŷ Pawb (2020)
 (2019) Gold Medal for Architecture of the National Eisteddfod of Wales for Tŷ Pawb, Wrexham, Wales  
 (2017) Finalist in BD Architect of the Year Award
 (2007) The Architecture Foundation’s Next Generation Award
 (2006) BD Young Architect of the Year Award (2006).

Teaching and Examining
 Central St Martins
 University of the Arts London, MA Narrative Environment
 University College London, former examiner
 London Metropolitan University, former examiner
 Oxford Brookes University, former examiner

Notes

References

Further reading

External links
 
 
 

Architects from Devon
Living people
Alumni of Kingston University
Alumni of The Bartlett
1966 births
Alumni of the Architectural Association School of Architecture